Andrei Vlăduț Pandele (born 9 July 2003) is a Romanian professional footballer who plays as a midfielder for Gloria Buzău on loan from FCSB.

Career statistics

Club

Honours

Club 
FCSB

 Cupa României: 2019–20

References

2003 births
Living people
Footballers from Bucharest
Romanian footballers
Association football midfielders
Liga I players
Liga II players
FC Steaua București players
FC Metaloglobus București players
FC Unirea Constanța players
FC Gloria Buzău players
Romania youth international footballers